Nizamabad or Nezamabad in Iran may refer to:

 Nizamabad, Golestan, a city in Golestan Province, Iran
 Nizamabad, Kerman, a city in Kerman Province, Iran
 Nezamabad, Qazvin, a village in Qazvin Province, Iran